Jankovice is a municipality and village in Kroměříž District in the Zlín Region of the Czech Republic. It has about 400 inhabitants.

Notable people
Bohumil Páník (born 1956), football manager; lives here
Hana Matelová (born 1990), table tennis player; lives here
Gabriela Gunčíková (born 1993), singer; lives here

References

Villages in Kroměříž District